The Alaska-class oil tanker is a class of VLCC tankers built by National Steel and Shipbuilding Company, San Diego. The tankers are double-hulled as mandated by the Oil Pollution Act of 1990, and will replace the existing fleet used by BP in the Alaskan area.

Design

Ships in class 
Four ships have been completed: Alaskan Frontier, Alaskan Explorer, Alaskan Navigator, and Alaskan Legend.

Derivatives 
The design was the basis of the Montford Point class of Mobile Landing Platforms for the US Navy.

References

Oil tankers
Petroleum in Alaska
Ships of BP
Ship classes